Ajugeae is a tribe of the subfamily Ajugoideae in the family Lamiaceae. It contains five genera: Acrymia Prain, Ajuga L., Cymaria Benth., Garrettia H. R. Fletcher, and Holocheila (Kudô) S. Chow.

References

Lamiaceae
Asterid tribes